The 1996 United States Senate election in Kansas was held November 5, 1996. Incumbent Republican U.S. Senator Nancy Kassebaum decided to retire instead of seeking a fourth term. Republican Pat Roberts won the open seat.

Term limits were an issue during the campaign; while Roberts said that he was not totally opposed to term limits, he was wary of limits that did not apply to current members of Congress, saying that the proposed limits should apply to everyone. While Thompson signed the national term limits pledge from the group Americans for Limited Terms, Roberts declined to do so, becoming the only major party candidate for the U.S. Senate in the 1996 elections to not sign the pledge. However, he did say that "I plan only to serve two terms in the U.S. Senate." In 2014, he was re-elected to a fourth and final term in office, before retiring in 2020.

Democratic primary

Candidates
 Sally Thompson, Kansas State Treasurer

Results

Republican primary

Candidates
 Pat Roberts, U.S. Representative
 Tom Little
 Tom Oyler
 Richard L. Cooley

Results

General election

Candidates
 Mark Marney (Reform)
 Pat Roberts (R), U.S. Representative
 Steven Rosile (L)
 Sally Thompson (D), Kansas State Treasurer

Results

See also
 1996 United States Senate elections

References

United States Senate
Kansas
1996